Story of Wine (스토리 오브 와인 Seutori obeu wain) is a 2008 South Korean film directed by Lee Cheol-ha and starring Lee Ki-woo. It is Korea's first interactive movie.

Plot
At the one year anniversary party for the wine bar Story of Wine, Min-sung made an exclusive wine list specifically paired with a unique story that represents the qualities of each wine. Love, lost, friendship, every bottle has a story.

Cast
 Lee Ki-woo - Min-sung
 Greena Park - Hwa-yeon
 Marcos Benjamin Lee - Hyuk-jun
 Seo Hyun-jin - Jin-ju
 No Min-woo - Taek-jin

Film festivals
 Official Selection - 12th Sonoma Valley Film Festival 2009
 Official Closing Night Film - 2nd Philadelphia Asian American Film Festival 2009
 Official Selection - The IXth WT Os International Film Festival 2009

References

External links
 

Films about wine
2008 films
2000s Korean-language films
South Korean drama films
2008 drama films
Films directed by Lee Cheol-ha
2000s South Korean films